Boltonia lautureana  is an East Asian species of plants in the family Asteraceae. It is native to China, Japan, Korea, and Asiatic Russia.

Boltonia lautureana  is a plant up to 100 cm (40 inches) tall. It has many daisy-like flower heads with blue ray florets and yellow disc florets.

References

External links
Flora Republicae Popularis Sinicae, 中国植物志 版权所有  ©  1959-2004  中国科学院《中国植物志》编委会  科学出版社 中国科学院植物研究所（系统与进化植物学国家重点实验室）数字植物项目组 京ICP备13006946号-2    网站统计     我有话要说 山马兰 Kalimeris lautureana (Debx.) Kitam.  in Chinese with several color photos

Astereae
Flora of the Russian Far East
Flora of China
Flora of Eastern Asia
Plants described in 1877